Long Son Petrochemicals Complex is an integrated petroleum and chemical complex being constructed in Long Son Island of Bà Rịa–Vũng Tàu province, Vietnam. It will be the first integrated petrochemical complex in the country once it is commissioned in 2023.  Covering an area of 460 hectares, the Long Son Refinery will have a capacity of 200,000 barrels a day. The project has met with several delays regarding site clearance.

References

Oil refineries in Vietnam